The 2007 Nigerian Senate election in Kebbi State was held on 21 April 2007, to elect members of the Nigerian Senate to represent Kebbi State. Adamu Aliero representing Kebbi Central, Abubakar Tanko Ayuba representing Kebbi South and Umaru Argungu representing Kebbi North all won on the platform of the People's Democratic Party.

Overview

Summary

Results

Kebbi Central 
The election was won by Adamu Aliero of the Peoples Democratic Party (Nigeria).

Kebbi South 
The election was won by Abubakar Tanko Ayuba of the Peoples Democratic Party (Nigeria).

Kebbi North 
The election was won by Umaru Argungu of the Peoples Democratic Party (Nigeria).

Succession 
Adamu Aliero was later appointed Minister of FCT in 2008, and he was succeeded by Abubakar Atiku Bagudu.

References 

April 2007 events in Nigeria
Kebbi State Senate elections
Keb